Eleanor Sherman Font (May 31, 1896-Sept. 8, 1982) was hired as prints curator at the Hispanic Society of America before expanding into iconography. She was one of six women chosen by Archer Milton Huntington to deepen their knowledge in art curation for the Society after graduating from library sciences programs. Her great-grandfather is Thomas Hopkins Gallaudet, founder of the American School for the Deaf in Hartford. She was deaf and volunteered for deaf causes throughout her life. During her life, she participated in services at St. Ann's Church for Deaf-Mutes, where she "sang" in American Sign Language with others in the choir.

References 

1896 births
1982 deaths
American art curators
American women curators
20th-century American women artists
20th-century American people